Tismice is a municipality and village in Kolín District in the Central Bohemian Region of the Czech Republic. It has about 500 inhabitants.

Administrative parts
The village of Limuzy is an administrative part of Tismice.

References

Villages in Kolín District